František Jan Škroup (3 June 1801 in Osice near Hradec Králové – 7 February 1862 in Rotterdam) was a Czech composer and conductor. His brother Jan Nepomuk Škroup was also a successful composer and his father, Dominik Škroup, and other brother Ignác Škroup were lesser known composers.

Biography 
At the age of eleven he moved to Prague where he supported himself as a choir boy and flautist. He continued his schooling at one of the most important Czech national revival movement centres, Hradec Králové, where he was a choirboy at the cathedral. While there he studied with the local choirmaster and composer Franz Volkert. He later moved back to Prague to study at the university. He became a fairly successful opera and singspiel composer producing more than a dozen stage works. Among Škroup's part-time jobs was organist at the "Temple of the Israelite Society for Regulated Worship," known since the late nineteen-forties as the "Spanish synagogue." His last position was as the musical director of the German opera in Dutch Rotterdam. He died there and, as a person without means, was buried in a mass grave. He also produced an oratorio, a mass, and a few other sacred works. He is best remembered today as the author of the melody for the Czech national anthem "Kde domov můj?".

Works 
From 1827 Škroup was a conductor at the Estates Theatre in Prague.  There he led the Czech premières of many famous works by composers such as Richard Wagner.  Škroup's oeuvre consists mainly of Czech and German opera which gained significant local popularity.

Opera, Singspiel and Incidental Music
 Dráteník, Singspiel in 2 Acts (1825); libretto by Josef Krasoslav Chmelenský; Škroup sang the title role. Dráteník is considered the first Czech opera.  
 Der Nachtschatten, Singspiel (1827); libretto C.J. Schikaneder
 Oldřich a Božena (Oldřich and Božena), Opera (1828); German title: Uldarich und Božena (1833); libretto by Josef Krasoslav Chmelenský
 Der Prinz und die Schlange (The Prince and the Snake, or Amor in the Amazon) (1829); Czech title: Princ a had neb Amor mezi Amazonkami (1835)
 Bratrovrah, Biblical Melodrama (1831); libretto by Jan Nepomuk Štěpánek
 Die Drachenhöhle (1832)
 Fidlovačka aneb Žádný hněv a žádná rvačka (Fidlovačka, or No Anger and No Brawl), Folk Scenes of Prague Life with Song and Dance (1834); play by Josef Kajetán Tyl; includes "Kde domov můj?"
 Libušin sňatek (Libuše's Marriage) (libretto by Josef Krasoslav Chmelenský, 1835, rewritten 1850)
 Čestmír (1835); incidental music to the historical drama 
 Pouť k chrámu umění (Pilgrimage to the Temple of Art) (1846)
 The Spectre's Bride
 Drahomíra, Opera (première 20 November 1848); German libretto by V.A. Svoboda-Návarovský
 Žižkova smrt (Žižka's Death) (1850); incidental music to the historical drama by Josef Jiří Kolár
 Der Meergeuse (The Sea Geus), Romantic Opera in 3 Acts (1851); libretto by Johann Carl Hickel; premièred in 2003 at the Estates Theatre in Prague; Czech title: Mořský geus
 Don César a spanilá Magelona (Don Cesar and the Comely Magolena), Incidental Music (1852)
 Columbus, Opera in 3 Acts (1855); original German libretto by Josef Krasoslav Chmelenský; Czech version premièred on 3 February 1942 with libretto translated by František Pujman

Orchestral
 Chrudimská ouvertura (Chrudim Overture) (1854); overture for the opening of the municipal theatre in Chrudim, Czech Republic

Chamber music
 String Quartet No. 1 in F major, Op. 24
 String Quartet No. 2 in C minor, Op. 25
 String Quartet No. 3 in G major, Op. 29
 Trio for Clarinet (or Violin), Cello and Piano, Op.27
 Trio facile in F Major for Violin (or Flute), Cello and Piano, Op.28
 Trio facile for Violin (or Flute), Cello and Piano, Op.30

Piano
 Polonaise
 Deutsche Tänze (1824)

Vocal
 Věnec ze zpěvů vlasteneckých uvitý a obětovaný dívkám vlastenským (Wreath of Patriotic Songs Collected for and Dedicated to Patriotic Girls) (1835–1839); 5 volumes edited by Škroup and Chmelenský
 Dobrou noc (Good Night) for Horn, Voice and Harp (or Piano); words by Josef Krasoslav Chmelenský
 Píseň společní; words by František Čelakovský; Both songs are included in Věnec ze zpěvů vlasteneckých uvitý a obětovaný dívkám vlastenským.
 Věnec (1843-1844), second part

References

External links
 Biography 
 

1801 births
1862 deaths
Czech classical composers
Czech male classical composers
National anthem writers
Czech opera composers
Male opera composers
People from Hradec Králové District
19th-century classical composers
19th-century Czech male musicians